The Council elections held in Wolverhampton on Thursday 2 May 1991 were one third, and 20 of the 60 seats were up for election.

During the 1991 election the Merry Hill ward had two seats contested due to a vacancy arising.

Prior to the election the constitution of the Council was:

Labour 31
Conservative 23
Liberal Democrats 4
Liberal 1
Vacancy 1

Following the election the constitution of the Council was:

Labour 35
Conservative 22
Liberal Democrats 3

Election result

1991
1991 English local elections
1990s in the West Midlands (county)